Vinita Park is a city in St. Louis County, Missouri, United States, located just east of I-170 and south of St. Charles Rock Road. The population was 1,970 at the 2020 census.

Geography
Vinita Park is located at  (38.690022, -90.337310).

Demographics

2020 census
As of the 2020 census there were 1,970 people and 709 households living in the city. The racial makeup of the city was 25.2% White (23.8% non-Hispanic White), 62.4% African American, 0.8% Native American, 1.0% Asian, 6.0% from other races, and 4.6% from two or more races. Hispanic or Latino of any race were 7.9% of the population.

2010 census
As of the census of 2010, there were 1,880 people, 761 households, and 496 families living in the city. The racial makeup of the city was 30.1% White, 64.9% African American, 0.5% Native American, 0.2% Asian, 2.0% from other races, and 2.2% from two or more races. Hispanic or Latino of any race were 4.7% of the population.

There were 761 households, of which 33.6% had children under the age of 18 living with them, 34.0% were married couples living together, 24.6% had a female householder with no husband present, 6.6% had a male householder with no wife present, and 34.8% were non-families. 29.7% of all households were made up of individuals, and 8.1% had someone living alone who was 65 years of age or older. The average household size was 2.46 and the average family size was 3.06.

The median age in the city was 33.6 years. 24.6% of residents were under the age of 18; 9.4% were between the ages of 18 and 24; 31.2% were from 25 to 44; 24.9% were from 45 to 64; and 9.8% were 65 years of age or older. The gender makeup of the city was 48.6% male and 51.4% female.

2000 census
As of the census of 2000, there were 1,924 people, 752 households, and 515 families living in the city. The racial makeup of the city was 61.75% African American, 33.00% White, 1.09% Asian, 0.36% Native American, 1.04% from other races, and 2.75% from two or more races. Hispanic or Latino of any race were 1.51% of the population.

There were 752 households, out of which 34.3% had children under the age of 18 living with them, 36.8% were married couples living together, 25.1% had a female householder with no husband present, and 31.4% were non-families. 26.3% of all households were made up of individuals, and 7.0% had someone living alone who was 65 years of age or older. The average household size was 2.56 and the average family size was 3.10.

In the city the population was spread out, with 29.6% under the age of 18, 9.3% from 18 to 24, 33.2% from 25 to 44, 18.0% from 45 to 64, and 9.9% who were 65 years of age or older. The median age was 31 years. For every 100 females, there were 87.3 males. For every 100 females age 18 and over, there were 80.4 males.

The median income for a household in the city was $29,482, and the median income for a family was $33,523. Males had a median income of $27,228 versus $23,951 for females. The per capita income for the city was $15,274. About 15.1% of families and 16.5% of the population were below the poverty line, including 25.0% of those under age 18 and 9.8% of those age 65 or over.

History
The City of Vinita Park—along with the Village of Vinita Terrace—gets its name from "Vinita Station", an electric rail car station that was located at the intersection of Midland and Page. The Vinita Park subdivision was laid out in 1905 by A.C. Stewart and was later marketed by Everett Davis, of the Davis Realty Development Company. A map titled "Vinita Park -- "The Next Reach", by the Davis Realty Development Company, is dated 1909 and can be found in the Library of Congress. On November 3, 1941, Vinita Park was incorporated as a village, including the northern subdivisions of Spring Avenue Heights and part of Midland Heights, the Atherton (south of Page Boulevard), and the Vinita Industrial Park. On March 13, 1950, Vinita Park changed its status to a City of the 4th Class. Voters of both Vinita Park and neighboring Vinita Terrace voted on November 8, 2016, to consolidate into one municipality, to be called the City of Vinita Park. 
The merger took effect on May 10, 2017.

Education
St. Louis County Library operates the Indian Trails Branch in Vinita Park.  Vinita Park has three different school districts: Normandy, Ritenour, and University City.

Government
Vinita Park has a mayor and a board of aldermen.  The mayor is elected to a four-year term and aldermen are elected to two-year terms.  There are three ward divisions which each elect two alderman as required by Missouri law (see here).  Therefore, there are six aldermen in Vinita Park. If there is ever a tie vote in the board of aldermen, the mayor casts a tie-breaking vote but otherwise does not vote. The current president of the board also happens to be the mayor's wife.

Police department
On June 1, 2015, Vinita Park initiated the North County Police Cooperative.  They have partnered with nearby cities, Vinita Terrace and Wellston in providing police services to their communities.  The cooperative currently has 30 police officers providing police protection in the area.

References

External links

Cities in St. Louis County, Missouri
Cities in Missouri